CBS MoneyWatch, a division of CBS News and a property of Paramount Global, is a personal finance website that provides advice on retirement, investing, money, work and real estate. Launched in April 2009, the site was originally an extension of BNET.com, formerly known as the CBS Interactive Business Network. In November 2011, BNET and CBS MoneyWatch merged and migrated to the CBSNews.com platform. The executive editor of CBS MoneyWatch is Glenn Coleman.

CBS MoneyWatch offers original feature stories, unique daily commentary, original videos, and daily business and financial news.

The MoneyWatch name comes from a long-running series of business-oriented segments on the CBS Evening News.

References

External links 
 

Financial services companies established in 2009
2009 establishments in New York City
CBS Interactive websites
Internet properties established in 2009
Mass media in New York City
Finance websites